Rectory Meadow is a   Local Nature Reserve in Hartley in Kent. It is owned  by Hartley Parish Council and managed by the council together with the North West Kent Countryside Project.

This site has chalk grassland and woodland. 193 species of flora have been recorded, including man orchids and cornflowers.

There is access from Hartley Road.

References

Local Nature Reserves in Kent